Acropogon is a genus of flowering plants in the family Malvaceae. The genus is endemic to New Caledonia. It contains around 25 species. Its closest relatives are Australian genera: Argyrodendron, Brachychiton and Franciscodendron.

List of species
, The Plant List accepted 24 species:

Acropogon aoupiniensis Morat
Acropogon austrocaledonicus (Hook.) Morat
Acropogon bosseri Morat & Chalopin
Acropogon bullatus (Pancher & Sebert) Morat
Acropogon calcicola Morat & Chalopin
Acropogon chalopiniae Morat
Acropogon domatifer Morat
Acropogon dzumacensis (Guillaumin) Morat
Acropogon fatsioides Schltr.
Acropogon francii (Guillaumin) Morat
Acropogon grandiflorus Morat & Chalopin
Acropogon horarius Gâteblé & Munzinger
Acropogon jaffrei Morat & Chalopin
Acropogon macrocarpus Morat & Chalopin
Acropogon margaretae Morat & Chalopin
Acropogon megaphyllus (Bureau & Poiss. ex Guillaumin) Morat
Acropogon merytifolius Morat & Chalopin
Acropogon moratianus Callm., Munzinger & Lowry
Acropogon paagoumenensis Morat & Chalopin
Acropogon pilosus Morat & Chalopin
Acropogon sageniifolia Schltr.
Acropogon schefflerifolius (Guillaumin) Morat
Acropogon schistophilus Morat & Chalopin
Acropogon schumanniana Schltr.
Acropogon tireliae Morat & Chalopin
Acropogon veillonii Morat

References

 
Flora of New Caledonia
Endemic flora of New Caledonia
Malvaceae genera
Taxonomy articles created by Polbot